Groomsville is a rural locality in the Toowoomba Region on the Darling Downs, Queensland, Australia.

The area remains undeveloped.

Geography

Part of the eastern and southwest boundary is marked by Cooby Creek.  The creek flows into and out of Cooby Dam which occupies the southern extremities of Groomsville.

Road infrastructure
The Pechey-Maclagan Road runs through from north-east to north-west, while Groomsville Road runs to the south-east.

History 
Jericho Estate Provisional School opened on 29 May 1906. In 1908 it was renamed Groomsville Provisional School. On 1 January 1909 it became Groomsville State School. The school closed in 1951.

Education 
There are no schools in Groomsville. The nearest primary schools are in Goombungee, Geham and Crows Nest. The nearest secondary school is in Crows Nest (up to Year 10). For Years 11 and 12, the nearest secondary school is in Highfields.

References

Toowoomba Region
Localities in Queensland